Alexander Constantine Dyer (born 14 November 1965) is an English football coach and former player who is the assistant manager to Alan Pardew at Greece Super League club Aris.

Dyer played mainly as a defender (he could also play in midfield) for eleven clubs in a seventeen-year professional career. His achievements as a player include helping Blackpool win promotion to the Third Division in 1985 and Crystal Palace to the First Division in 1989.

Playing career
Dyer began his youth career at Watford, but did not make a senior appearance for the club, signing instead for Blackpool for whom he made 108 appearances between 1983 and 1987. He moved on to Hull City in 1987 making 60 appearances, scoring 14 times, over the next two seasons. On 9 November 1988 Dyer signed for Crystal Palace and made his debut on 12 November, as a substitute for Neil Redfearn in an away 0–2 defeat to AFC Bournemouth. Redfearn moved on to Watford on 18 November and Dyer took his number seven shirt for the next six games before losing his place to Eddie McGoldrick, who signed from Northampton Town on 9 January 1989. Those seven appearances (one goal) made up Dyer's total for the 1988–89 season in which Palace achieved promotion to the top tier. Dyer remained at Palace for the 1989–90 season making 10 further appearances and scoring one other goal, before moving on to Charlton Athletic. He subsequently played for, Oxford United, Lincoln City, Barnet, F.C. Maia (Portugal), Huddersfield Town and Notts County before moving into non-league football firstly with Kingstonian and then Hayes.

Coaching and management career
Having been employed for eight months as a PE Teacher in a South London school, in April 2004 he joined West Ham United as assistant to sports scientist Tony Strudwick. His role at the club changed to conditioning coach in July 2007. and following Kevin Keen's promotion to first-team coach, reserve team coach in September 2008.

In January 2011 he left the Hammers to link up with Chris Powell as assistant manager at Charlton Athletic. On 27 May 2014 Dyer was sacked from Charlton after the appointment of Bob Peeters as manager.

Following the appointment of Powell as the new manager of Huddersfield Town, Dyer, a former Terrier himself, joined the Yorkshire side as assistant manager on 3 September 2014.
When Powell was dismissed on 4 November 2015, Dyer also left his post.

On 7 April 2017 Dyer was appointed manager of Welling United until the end of the season. Despite being keen to continue in the manager's role, Welling announced a new management team for the coming season on 12 May 2017. Dyer was appointed as a first team coach at National League South club Whitehawk in October 2017. 

He left Whitehawk within days to assist Steve Clarke at Kilmarnock. Clarke was appointed Scotland manager in June 2019, and Dyer became his assistant there while he continued as assistant manager at Kilmarnock under Angelo Alessio. Dyer was made caretaker manager of Kilmarnock after Alessio was sacked in December 2019. After three games in caretaker charge, Dyer was appointed Kilmarnock manager to the end of the 2019–20 season. In June 2020, Dyer signed a permanent two-year contract with Kilmarnock. On 30 January 2021, Dyer left Kilmarnock by mutual consent.

In June 2021 he joined Colchester United as assistant manager to Hayden Mullins.
On 19 January 2022, Dyer departed the club.

Dyer was assistant to Alan Pardew at CSKA Sofia in Bulgaria. Dyer, who is black, left with Pardew on 1 June 2022 after what the manager described as a "small group of organised racist fans who tried to sabotage this match" against Botev Plovdiv on 19 May.

Career statistics

Managerial record

initially caretaker.

References

External links
 
 Lincoln City F.C. Official Archive Profile

1965 births
Footballers from Forest Gate
Living people
Association football defenders
English footballers
Black British sportsmen
Blackpool F.C. players
Hull City A.F.C. players
Crystal Palace F.C. players
Charlton Athletic F.C. players
Oxford United F.C. players
Lincoln City F.C. players
Barnet F.C. players
Huddersfield Town A.F.C. players
Notts County F.C. players
Kingstonian F.C. players
Hayes F.C. players
F.C. Maia players
English expatriate sportspeople in Portugal
English expatriate footballers
Expatriate footballers in Portugal
West Ham United F.C. non-playing staff
Charlton Athletic F.C. non-playing staff
Welling United F.C. managers
Kilmarnock F.C. non-playing staff
English football managers
Kilmarnock F.C. managers
Huddersfield Town A.F.C. non-playing staff
Scottish Professional Football League managers
Whitehawk F.C. managers
Colchester United F.C. non-playing staff
Association football coaches
English expatriate sportspeople in Bulgaria